Tucumcari Municipal Airport  is about six miles east of Tucumcari, New Mexico.

History
Opened in August 1941, Tucumcari Municipal Airport was built by the United States Army Air Forces and at the time it was known as Fort Sumner Army Auxiliary Airfield #7, being subordinate to Fort Sumner Army Air Field. The airfield provided primary glider pilot training.

The glider school was operated under contract by the Cutter-Carr Flying Service, under the general supervision of the 9th Glider Training Detachment, 36th Flying Training Wing, Western Flying Training Command. Training was conducted using Aeronca TG-5 combat training gliders, towed by C-47 Skytrain aircraft.

The flight cadets consisted of both experienced sailplane pilots and others who had washed out of conventional pilot training and were given a second chance to fly. The possibility of officer's pay and the chance to fly attracted a particular breed of risk-tolerant trainees. Trainees were given instruction on how to follow a tow plane and fly the unpowered aircraft to the designated landing zone.

Unlike powered pilots, combat training was also provided, as once a pilot committed to a landing and discovered, as he got closer, frequently the landing zone was under fire, mined, or otherwise obstructed, and he would have little room to maneuver to make a safe landing. Once the landing was made, the glider pilot then became another infantryman.

Once the glider pilot cadet successfully completed primary training, he moved on to advanced training, taught by AAF instructors at several military glider schools.

The school closed in March 1943 as part of the drawdown of the Army Air Forces pilot training program. It was declared surplus and turned over to the Army Corps of Engineers.

The facility became a prisoner of war camp in March 1944.

The airport was eventually discharged to the War Assets Administration (WAA) after the end of World War II.

Civil use
Pioneer Airlines served the airport from 1948 until 1953–54, one of several stops on their route between Albuquerque and Dallas. Douglas DC-3s were used at first, replaced by 36-seat Martin 202s in 1953.
Trans Central Airlines briefly served Tucumcari in 1970 with Cessna 402s to Albuquerque and Amarillo.
Airfreight carrier South Aero currently provides feeder service for UPS Airlines with flights to Albuquerque. This service was formerly provided by Ameriflight during the 2010's.

See also

 New Mexico World War II Army Airfields
 36th Flying Training Wing (World War II)
 Fort Sumner Municipal Airport

References

External links
 
 

1941 establishments in New Mexico
USAAF Contract Flying School Airfields
USAAF Glider Training Airfields
Airfields of the United States Army Air Forces in New Mexico
Transportation in Quay County, New Mexico
Buildings and structures in Quay County, New Mexico
Airports in New Mexico
Airports established in 1941